Maria Pitillo (born January 8, 1966) is an American retired actress. She has starred in films and on television, most notably as Audrey Timmonds in Godzilla (1998). She also had a recurring role on the TV series Providence.

Early life
Pitillo was born on January 8, 1966, in Elmira, New York, and grew up in Mahwah, New Jersey. Her parents divorced and her father moved Maria and her sisters, Lisa and Gina, to Mahwah, New Jersey. She attended Mahwah High School, where she was on the track team, before transferring to Northern Highlands Regional High School. She was prevented from attending her high school graduation ceremony after an altercation with her English teacher.

Career

1986–1992 
Pitillo was living in suburban New Jersey, and working as a department store clerk when a friend invited her to audition for a TV commercial.  Her first job was an advertisement for Pepto Bismol. Subsequent commercial work included an ad for Bank of Boston, York Peppermint Pattie, Kentucky Fried Chicken, and Chic Jeans, among others. In the fall of 1987, Pitillo was cast as Nancy Don (Lewis) on the ABC soap opera, Ryan's Hope, which lasted until that series ended its run in 1989.

Pitillo later said that she did not consider acting as a serious career choice until after Chaplin (1992).

1990s 

Upon moving to Hollywood, Pitillo's work consisted primarily of television drama (South of Sunset), small parts in theatrical motion pictures, and included starring roles in several Made-For-TV movies. She earned critical praise for her roles in the following: Middle Ages, Escape from Terror: The Teresa Stamper Story, as well as Between Love and Honor. Pitillo's career breakthrough came with the 1995 FOX sitcom Partners. Cast as Alicia Sondergard, the comedy met with critical success for herself, as well as for co-stars Jon Cryer, and Tate Donovan. Partners failed to gain traction with audiences, however, and was cancelled in the Spring of 1996.

After completing Dear God in the summer of 1996, Pitillo was contacted by NBC President Warren Littlefield, who had taken notice of her performance in Partners. Littlefield then signed her to a development deal with the network.

In early 1997, while trying to acquire a stake in DreamWorks Studios, NBC tried to leverage Pitillo, as well as director James Burrows, with a project titled Nearly Yours, which actress Parker Posey had dropped out of. DreamWorks and NBC could not come to an agreement, and the deal collapsed. The squabbling between NBC and DreamWorks left the network with a programming hole, and Pitillo without a television project for all of 1997. It wasn't until filming began on Something To Believe In (1997), and Godzilla (May 1997), that she returned to work. NBC continued to search for a suitable television project for Pitillo, and with input from Littlefield, developed the sitcom House Rules, which aired as a mid-season replacement in March 1998.

Godzilla (1998)
Pitillo starred as Audrey Timmonds in the TriStar Pictures film Godzilla, which opened in theaters on May 20, 1998. The film and Pitillo's performance were skewered by fans and critics alike:

"At its release, the film was much criticized by Godzilla fans the world over. Kenpachiro Satsuma, the actor who portrayed Godzilla in the second series of films (1984–1995) walked out of a Tokyo screening and told reporters that, 'It's not Godzilla, it does not have the spirit."

Godzilla was nominated in several categories for Razzie awards, and Pitillo herself won the Golden Raspberry Award for Worst Supporting Actress in 1999. Pitillo is known to have commented once about her role in Godzilla:

"This movie isn't written for big performances from its actors," Pitillo says. "I don't expect a lot from it. It won't be like, `Oh, Maria Pitillo is a great actress.' But it's an opportunity for people to see me."

Godzilla 2 (1999)

Pitillo, Matthew Broderick, and Jean Reno were each under contract for a total of three Godzilla films. The first installment, having earned $379 million during its theatrical run, ensured that a sequel would be considered. Tri Star Pictures, which owned rights to the franchise, called on Centropolis to begin pre-production work on a sequel, which was tentatively titled Godzilla 2.   Ultimately, there was little enthusiasm to move forward, and the rights to the franchise were allowed to expire.

Late career
By 2000, Pitillo had starred in the indie film Dirk & Betty and the comedy-drama After Sex, and made guest appearances on several television shows. Her last film role was the made-for-TV movie The Christmas Secret, starring Richard Thomas and Beau Bridges. It originally aired on CBS, and later broadcast on the ABC Family network as part of their 25 Days of Christmas.  She had a recurring role on Providence (2001–2002) as Tina Calcatera, a divorced mother, and love interest of Robbie, played by Seth Peterson, a role which lasted until the series ended in 2002.

Unsold pilots
In The Loop (1998)
 Pilot produced, total of seven scripts written.
 Co-Starred Joely Fisher, and Lisa Edelstein.
 Pilot directed by James Burrows, third collaboration with Burrows, second with Edelstein.

People Who Fear People (1999) w/Jon Cryer, directed by James Burrows
 Jon Cryer, a Partners co-star,  participated in this project.
 This was her second collaboration with Cryer, and fourth with Burrows.
 Pitillo's role was recast, and this series became The Trouble With Normal (2000). 

Follow The Leeds (2003)
 Competed with three other pilots for slot in Lifetime Televisions Fall 2003 line up.
 Co-starred Sharon Lawrence and Marsha Mason.

The Angriest Man in Suburbia (2006)
 Co-starring Mitch Rouse and debuted Kiernan Shipka.
 Unclear if this work aired, however, it was posted to YouTube, until Sony had it removed.

It's About This Guy (Date Unknown)
 Starred as Maddie Chase.

Personal life 
Pitillo married David R. Fortney in 2002, and lives in Ross, California. She is of Italian and Irish descent.

It is most often noted that Pitillo got into acting after a chance encounter with a friend, while some publicity material suggests that participating in Summer stock theater provided Pitillo the impetus to act professionally.

Filmography

Film

Television

References

External links
 

1966 births
Actresses from New Jersey
Actresses from New York (state)
American film actresses
American television actresses
American soap opera actresses
American people of Irish descent
American people of Italian descent
Living people
Mahwah High School alumni
People from Elmira, New York
People from Mahwah, New Jersey
People from Ross, California
21st-century American women